Philodromus californicus is a species of running crab spider in the family Philodromidae. It is found in North America.

References

californicus
Articles created by Qbugbot
Spiders described in 1884